or just simply Dreamland, was a theme park near Nara, Japan, heavily inspired by Disneyland in California. It was in continuous operation for 45 years, from 1961, closing permanently in 2006 as a result of falling attendance. The park was left abandoned until it was demolished between October 2016 and December 2017.

Beginnings 
On July 1, 1961, Nara Dreamland was opened to the public. The entrance to the park was designed to look almost identical to Disneyland, including its own versions of the Train Depot, Main Street, U.S.A., and the familiar Sleeping Beauty Castle at the hub.  It also had a Matterhorn-type mountain (with a Matterhorn Bobsleds-type ride, called Bobsleigh) with a Skyway running through it, as well as an Autopia-type ride and a monorail. 

The park also had its own mascots, Ran-chan and Dori-chan, two children dressed as bearskin guards.

The park was initially popular as it was the closest thing to Disneyland in Japan. At its peak, the park had 1.7 million visitors a year.

Decline 
In 1979, The Oriental Land Company made contact with The Walt Disney Company to create a Disney theme park in Tokyo.

After Tokyo Disneyland opened in 1983, the number of visitors to Nara Dreamland slowly began to decrease, as more people were interested in going to the said Disney park. This marked the beginning of the downfall for Dreamland, with attendance numbers dropping to around a million visitors a year. MEC, including Nara Dreamland, was bought by the supermarket chain Daiei in 1993.

In 2001, Tokyo DisneySea opened next to Tokyo Disneyland, and Universal Studios Japan opened as well in Osaka, the latter of which is about 40 kilometers away from Nara Dreamland. After those two parks opened, Dreamland's attendance numbers worsened, plummeting to 400,000 visitors a year. 

In 2004, the park began to decline in quality; some stores closed down and some attractions began to rust. 

On August 31, 2006, the park closed down for good. It was left abandoned for 10 years and it would be demolished in October 2016.

Sale and demolition 
Nara City's government gained ownership of the park after the park's owner fell behind in property taxes. In 2013, the city put the site up for auction but the auction received no bids. In 2015 the city put the property up for auction again. This time, an Osaka-based real estate company named SK Housing won the bid, paying 730 million Yen (or $6 million in USD).

In October 2016, a Japanese newspaper reported that SK Housing had started the demolition process. On October 14, 2016, an urban explorer visited Nara Dreamland and reported seeing demolition vehicles tearing down the Main Street area. It was later confirmed online by regular visitors that the demolition process was officially underway as of October 10, 2016 and that it was due to take 14 months. Demolition of the park started in October 2016 and was completed on December 21, 2017.

Attractions

The park contained several rides prior to closing, including:
 Aska, a wooden roller coaster based on The Cyclone at Coney Island
 Screw Coaster, a double-corkscrew steel roller coaster designed by Arrow Development 
 Bobsleigh, a steel roller coaster modeled after the Matterhorn Bobsleds
 Gallantry, a shooting dark ride
 Fantasy Coaster
 Kid's Coaster
 Figure-8 monorail
 Go Kart

Other rides included a carousel, a Mad Tea Party-styled ride, a haunted maze, a small powered coaster, a Jungle Cruise-styled ride, and a log flume.

Popularity with urban explorers
Nara Dreamland was a popular destination for haikyoists, or urban explorers.

Additionally, many have reported hearing strange noises near the park's boats. Some speculate that it may have been caused by a running water pump or a type of bull frog.

See also
 Yokohama Dreamland
 Wonderland Amusement Park (Beijing)

References

Sources
 Dreamland at Theme Park Review
 Dreamland at JCOM
 Dreamland at LaughingPlace
  at Japan Property Central
  at Matsuo Performing Arts Foundation
  at The Foundation Matsuo Scholarship Society
  at Nara Dreamland's official website on the Internet Archive's Wayback Machine.

External links
 Nara Dreamland at night
 Exploring Nara Dreamland
 Photos of the abandoned park
 Visiting Nara Dreamland

Defunct amusement parks in Japan
Buildings and structures in Nara Prefecture
1961 establishments in Japan
2006 disestablishments in Japan
Amusement parks opened in 1961
Amusement parks closed in 2006
Demolished buildings and structures in Japan